Joaquín 'Ximo' Enguix Pachés (born 18 February 1978 in Tavernes de la Valldigna, Valencia) is a Spanish retired footballer who played as a defensive midfielder.

External links

CiberChe biography and stats 

1978 births
Living people
People from Safor
Sportspeople from the Province of Valencia
Spanish footballers
Footballers from the Valencian Community
Association football midfielders
La Liga players
Segunda División players
Segunda División B players
Valencia CF Mestalla footballers
Valencia CF players
UD Salamanca players
Recreativo de Huelva players
Polideportivo Ejido footballers
Sporting de Gijón players
Rayo Vallecano players
CD Castellón footballers
UD Melilla footballers
CD Toledo players
Spanish football managers
Tercera División managers